Pessocosma bistigmalis is a moth in the family Crambidae. It was described by Pryer in 1877. It is found in China.

References

Spilomelinae
Moths described in 1877